Stepan Kuznetsov was a Soviet male actor. People's Artist of the RSFSR.

Selected filmography 
 1923 — Locksmith and Chancellor
 1927 — Man from the Restaurant
 1927 — Solistka ego velichestva

References

External links 
 Степан Кузнецов on kino-teatr.ru

Soviet male actors
1879 births
1932 deaths